Luis Nubiola (born May 28, 1974) is a Cuban-born jazz saxophonist, composer and teacher.

Early life in Cuba

Luis is graduated as an instrumentalist saxophone teacher from the National Conservatory of Music in Havana Amadeo Roldan. He studied under the class of Carlos Averhoff.

He joined the Cuban music group PG, under the direction of conductor and flutist José Luis Cortes (El Tosco), founder of the group NG La Banda.

Career
 
In 2001, Luis Nubiola moved to Costa Rica. In December 2005 he recorded his first CD, a musical production under the name of “Nubiola”. In December 2008, Luis Nubiola produced  “Live at Jazz Café” the first Jazz DVD ever recorded in Costa Rica together with Dart. This DVD is a live version of “Nubiola” CD which within the same year, made him the winner of the ACAM  award as “Composer of the Year in Jazz Genre”. In his new material “914”, also with Dart and awarded as Best Album of the Year 2009, was a double DVD/CD.

Since 2009, Luis Nubiola lives in Europe.
Luis Nubiola Trio and his  release: "Memories from the Baltic", he is promoting his work and recording new material with musicians from Poland.
With these artists, Luis Nubiola fuses aspects of his Cuban culture and the recognized tradition of Polish jazz, whilst incorporating aspects of the traditional folk music of both cultures.

The recording "O3", is an international coalition with his friend Frank Parker(USA) and Marcin Checzke (Poland), once again forming a trio with  special guests, Wojciech Olszewski and Krzysztof Dys (piano) and Marcin Mały Górny (pads).
 
Luis Nubiola Live at the Music Theatre in Lodz (feat. Jose Torres), five tunes with a special guest, the Cuban percussionist Jose Torres, who has lived in Poland for over thirty years. This material is part of a series of songs composed by Luis Nubiola during a four months visit to the  Republic of Turkey. One of these tunes, “Aturk”, is dedicated to the father of the Turkish homeland, Mustafa Kemal Atatürk.
 
Along with Jose Torres this material features great Polish musicians such as Wojciech Olszewski on piano, Krzysztof Szmańda drums and Marcin Chenczke double bass.

The Music Agency Polskie Radio invites 1 April at 7 pm to Lutosławski Studio for the concert promoting the album of the great saxophonist Luis Nubiola "Global Friendship".

Global Friendship is an idea to unify compositions from great musicians and friends who has residence in such as different places as Cuba, Poland, Costa Rica, USA, Spain etc. This album has the participation of Krzysztof Szmanda drums, Marcin Chenczke bass Krzysztof Dys piano, like in previous recordings, including this time as special guests the trombonist Michał Tomaszczyk and Ola Trzaska voice.

Luis Nubiola had a special appearance in the Film "Cold War" official trailer winner of Best Director Cannes Film Festival 2018 and 3 Oscar Nominations in 2019.

His latest albums „Ten Plagues” and Live from the Jazz Cafe Costa Rica 2019, are already available in all platforms. Ten Plagues  is an album with open forms and with a very expressive interpretation, as guests Jacek Mazurkiewicz on bass, Krzysztof Szmanda drums and the percussionist Philip South from Australia. 

The LP Jazz Cafe Costa Rica 2019 is a vinyl LP, recorded live in San Jose Costa Rica, with well-known musicians such as Walter Flores piano, Nelson Segura bass and Gilberto Jarquin on drums. This album has influence from the Scandinavian music and  there is a tune who is a   version of a famous ballad from the well-known Polish pianist and composer, Krzysztof Komeda, and another composition dedicated to the Polish Jazz icon Tomasz Stańko.

A new EP is already on digital platforms. Jazz Dart Sessions (Live) is a concert recorded in Costa Rica 2019, at the studio  house of the producer, creator and dreamer artist, Vinicio Musmanni. Jazz Dart Sessions (Live) reminds us a   kind of experimental music as well as Jazz music from places like Scandinavia and some other parts of Europe.  Walter Flores piano. Nelson Segura double bass,  Gilberto Jarquin drums.

Live at BARdzo bardzo is the most recent concert recorded live.

Discography
 "Nubiola" (2005).
 "Live at the Jazz Café" (2007).
 "Coltrane´s Tunes“ (2007).
 "914" (2008).
 "Memories from the Baltic" (2012).
 "Nubiola / Chenczke / Parker: 03" (2015).
 "Luis Nubiola Live at the Music Theatre in Lodz (feat. Jose Torres)" (2015).
 "Live at the Blue Note Poznan" (2016)
 "Global Friendship" (2017).
 "Live at the Jazz Cafe Costa Rica 2019" (2020).
 "Ten Plagues" (2020).
 "Jazz Dart Sessions (live)" (2021).
 "Live at Bardzo bardzo” (2022).

Awards and honors
 First place  in the national musical contest Amadeo Roldan, 1990.
 ACAM (Association of Composers and Musical Authors of Costa Rica) for best Jazz Album of the Year, "Nubiola",  2007  
 "914" Best Jazz Album, 2009

References

External links

1974 births
Living people
Cuban jazz saxophonists
21st-century saxophonists